Xavière Tiberi is the spouse of the former mayor of Paris Jean Tiberi. She is mostly known for being involved in corruption scandals in the Paris region.

Xavière Tiberi received 200,000 French Francs for a report on francophonie for the general counsel of the Essonne département. This 36-page long report, possibly written after the payment as a justification, was extremely poorly written (contained numerous spelling and grammatical mistakes, for instance). 

In 1998, a justice-ordered search of Jean and Xavière Tiberi's apartment on the Place du Panthéon showed that they possessed illegal firearms. They were not prosecuted in exchange for the destruction of the weapons. 

The above actions are sometimes referred to by the press as Corsican mores .

On 9 November 2004, Xavière Tibéri and Aurélie Filippetti, an elected official from the French Green Party, wrangled after a tense district council meeting. Each of them accused the other one of assault or threats. Mrs. Tibéri had a head trauma, which she claimed was caused by Mrs. Filipetti pushing her over; she filed a complaint.

Xavière Tiberi was caricatured on Les Guignols de l'info as an aggressive, dishonest, vulgar and greedy woman.

Friend of Jean-Edern Hallier, she has been Cercle InterHallier member since 2019.

References 

Living people
Year of birth missing (living people)
French people of Corsican descent